Levan Gureshidze (born September 21, 1988) is a Georgian luger who has competed since 2008. He finished 55th in the 2008-09 Luge World Cup.

Gureshidze qualified for the 2010 Winter Olympics but withdrew from the competition after teammate Nodar Kumaritashvili died during a training run accident at the Olympics. He instead flew back to Georgia to mourn the loss of his teammate at Kumaritashvili's funeral.

References

External links
 

1988 births
Living people
Male lugers from Georgia (country)
Olympic lugers of Georgia (country)
Lugers at the 2010 Winter Olympics